Gael-Taca is an Irish language promotional organisation in County Cork in the Republic of Ireland. They are based on Sullivan's Quay in Cork City where they run a shop and café. The organisation focuses on promoting the Irish language in the business sector and on trying to expand the number of Irish language immersion schools or Gaelscoileanna in County Cork.

History
The group was established in 1987 by Pádraig Ó Cuanacháin who remained their Marketing Director until he died in 2008.

Activities
Gael-Taca provides a free consultancy service to businesses that want to incorporate the Irish language in their business, including encouraging property developers to choose Irish language names for their new developments, and they answer general Irish language queries from the public in Cork .

Gradam Uí Chuanacháin 
The annual Gradam Uí Chuanacháin award is named after Ó Cuanacháin and is awarded by Gael-Taca to the business that has, in their view, promoted or used the Irish language the best in Cork in the preceding year.

See also
 Gaeltacht Irish speaking regions in Ireland. 	
 Bailte Seirbhíse Gaeltachta Gaeltacht Service Towns.	
 Líonraí Gaeilge Irish language networks.
 20-Year Strategy for the Irish Language 2010-2030	  	
 Gaelscoil Irish language-medium primary school - often used to refer to Irish language-medium secondary schools also.  	
 Gaelcholáiste Irish language-medium secondary school.	 	
 Gaillimh le Gaeilge Galway city-based Irish language organisation who work with the business sector.	 	
 Forbairt Feirste Belfast-based Irish language organisation who work with the business sector.

References

External links
 Gael-Taca website

Irish language organisations